Sarah A. Collins Fernandis (March 8, 1863 – July 11, 1951) was an American social worker, writer, and community leader, based in Baltimore, Maryland. 
She organized settlement houses in Washington, D.C. and Rhode Island, and worked for improved living conditions and healthcare for Black city residents.

Early life 
Sarah Collins was born in Port Deposit, Maryland, during the American Civil War, and raised in Baltimore, the daughter of Caleb Alexander Collins and Mary Jane Driver Collins. Her father worked at a lumberyard after the war, and her mother was a laundress. She earned an undergraduate degree from Hampton Institute in 1882, and a master's degree in social work from New York University. She wrote the lyrics to the Hampton Institute alma mater.

Career 

Collins taught school for about twenty years, in Virginia, Maryland, Tennessee, Georgia, and Florida, sometimes under the auspices of the Women's Home Missionary Society of Boston. She organized and led the Colored Social Settlement House in Washington, D.C. in 1902. She later was head resident at another settlement house in East Greenwich, Rhode Island from 1908 to 1912. She improved the houses and their neighborhoods with libraries, classrooms, clinics, playgrounds, childcare, events, and even basic banking services.

She was founder and president of the Women's Cooperative Civic League in 1913, and during World War I she organized a War Camp Community Center for Black soldiers stationed in Pennsylvania. In 1920, she became the first Black social worker employed by the Baltimore public health department. She organized to establish the Henryton State Hospital for Black tuberculosis patients. She retired from the city health department in 1933, but opened a National Youth Administration office in 1936, to help place homeless young women in employment and housing. She also lectured for the National League of Women Voters, lobbied for compulsory school attendance laws and for quality low-income housing.

Fernandis wrote songs for her educational and community-building work, and her poems were often published in the Southern Workman. She published two volumes of poetry, Poems and Vision, in 1925.

Personal life 
Sarah Collins married barber John Fernandis in 1902. Sarah Collins Fernandis died in 1951, aged 88 years, in Baltimore. There is a room at the YMCA in Baltimore named for Fernandis.

References

External links 
"Put Unity in Community" (1919), rally song; lyrics by Sarah Collins Fernandis, music by Frank Casper; sheet music in the Library of Congress
Iris Carlton-LaNey, African American leadership: An empowerment tradition in social welfare history (NASW Press, 2001) ; includes a chapter on Fernandis
Lorraine Elena Roses, Ruth Elizabeth Randolph, eds., Harlem's Glory: Black Women Writing, 1900-1950 (Harvard University Press 1996) ; includes "A Blossom in an Alley", a poem by Fernandis

1863 births
1951 deaths
People from Port Deposit, Maryland
American social workers
American women poets
American educators
American women in World War I
Hampton University alumni